Plain Talk is a studio album by American jazz organist Jimmy Smith featuring performances recorded in 1960 but not released on the Blue Note label until 1968. The album was rereleased on CD combined with Open House (1960) in 1992 compiling all the recordings from the session.

Reception
The Allmusic review by Michael Erlewine awarded the album 4 stars calling it "a fast-paced studio jam session".

Track listing
 "Big Fat Mama" (Lucky Millinder, Stafford Simon) – 11:12
 "My One and Only Love" (Robert Mellin, Guy Wood) – 5:14
 "Plain Talk" (Jimmy Smith) – 15:24
 "Time After Time" (Cahn, Styne) – 6:31

Personnel

Musicians
 Jimmy Smith – organ
 Blue Mitchell – trumpet (tracks 1, 2, 3; feature track 2)
 Jackie McLean – alto saxophone (track 3)
 Ike Quebec – tenor saxophone (tracks 1, 3, 4; feature track 4)
 Quentin Warren – guitar
 Donald Bailey – drums

Technical
 Alfred Lion – producer
 Rudy Van Gelder – engineer
 Photomedia – photography
 Nat Hentoff – liner notes

References

Blue Note Records albums
Jimmy Smith (musician) albums
1969 albums
Albums recorded at Van Gelder Studio
Albums produced by Alfred Lion